The 2020 Missouri gubernatorial election was held on November 3, 2020, to elect the Governor of Missouri, concurrently with the 2020 U.S. presidential election, as well as elections to the United States Senate, elections to the United States House of Representatives, and various state and local elections. Incumbent Republican Governor Mike Parson ran for and was elected to a full term in office. Parson was elected as lieutenant governor in 2016 but became governor on June 1, 2018, after incumbent Eric Greitens resigned under threat of impeachment by the state legislature. Parson declared his bid for a full term on September 8, 2019. State Auditor Nicole Galloway, Missouri's only Democratic statewide officer and only female statewide officer, was the Democratic nominee and if elected, would have become Missouri's first female governor.

In October 2020, The Washington Post identified this state election as one of eight whose outcomes could affect partisan balance during post-census redistricting.

Despite most news agencies characterizing the race as only leaning Republican, Mike Parson went on to win the election by a landslide of 16.4%, widely outperforming all election polling as well as justifying the former swing state's trend towards the GOP. He even exceeded Donald Trump's statewide victory margin in the concurrent presidential election, which was actually greater than that in neighboring Kansas for the first time in 104 years. Galloway suffered the largest margin of defeat for a Democratic gubernatorial candidate in Missouri since Betty Hearnes' 29-point loss in 1988.

Republican primary

Candidates

Nominee
Mike Parson, incumbent governor of Missouri and former state senator

Eliminated in primary
Saundra McDowell, U.S. Air Force veteran and Republican nominee for Missouri state auditor in 2018
Jim Neely, state representative from the 8th district
Raleigh Ritter, rancher and businessman

Declined
Jay Ashcroft, Missouri Secretary of State
Eric Greitens, former governor of Missouri
Tony Monetti, retired bomber pilot, assistant dean of aviation at University of Central Missouri, and Republican candidate for the U.S. Senate in 2018

Endorsements

Polling

Results

Democratic primary

Candidates

Nominee
 Nicole Galloway, Missouri state auditor

Eliminated in primary
 Eric Morrison, community leader and pastor
 Antoin Johnson
 Jimmie Matthews
 Robin Quaethem

Declined
 Sly James, former mayor of Kansas City, Missouri
 Jason Kander, former Missouri Secretary of State, Democratic nominee for U.S. Senate in 2016, former candidate for Mayor of Kansas City in 2019
 Claire McCaskill, former U.S. Senator
 Scott Sifton, state senator from the 1st district and former state representative from the 96th district (endorsed Galloway)

Endorsements

Results

Other candidates

Libertarian Party

Nominee
Rik Combs, U.S. Air Force veteran

Results

Green Party

Nominee
Jerome Bauer

Results

General election

Predictions

Polling

Eric Greitens vs Nicole Galloway

Mike Parson vs Jason Kander

Mike Parson vs. Scott Sifton

Endorsements

Results

See also
 2020 Missouri elections

Notes

Partisan clients

References

Further reading
 . (About redistricting).

External links
Official campaign websites
 Rik Combs (L) for Governor 
 Nicole Galloway (D) for Governor
 Mike Parson (R) for Governor

2020
Governor
Missouri